Harry P. Van Guilder (July 6, 1890 – November 23, 1979) was a member of the Wisconsin State Assembly.

Biography
Van Guilder was born on July 6, 1890 in Cannon Falls, Minnesota. Later, he moved to Ashland, Wisconsin and married Mary Eileen Habelt. He died on November 23, 1979.

Career
Van Guilder was a member of the Assembly from 1937 to 1942. In 1944, he was a candidate for the United States House of Representatives from Wisconsin's 10th congressional district. He lost to incumbent Alvin O'Konski. Van Guilder was a member of the Wisconsin Progressive Party.

References

People from Goodhue County, Minnesota
People from Ashland, Wisconsin
Members of the Wisconsin State Assembly
Wisconsin Progressives (1924)
1890 births
1979 deaths
20th-century American politicians